Neenu Nakkare Haalu Sakkare is a 1991 Indian Kannada-language comedy film directed by Dorai–Bhagavan. It stars Vishnuvardhan in the lead role opposite five heroines. The music was composed by Hamsalekha. The story revolves round Subbu’s (Vishnuvardhan) hunt for a suitable wife and how he eventually finds one, with many hilarious scenes. Ambareesh makes a cameo appearance.

Cast
 Vishnuvardhan as Subba Rao aka Subbu
 Srinath as Pavan Kumar 
 Ambareesh as himself (Cameo)
 Rupini as Rukmini
 Vinaya Prasad as Ramya
 Rajani as Lakshmi
 Chandrika as Urvashi
 Anjali Sudhakar as Sheela
 Balakrishna 
 Mukhyamantri Chandru 
 Umashree
 Ramesh Bhat
 M. S. Umesh 
 Ashalatha
 Shantamma

Soundtrack
All songs and lyrics were composed by Hamsalekha.
 "Baanalli Ninninda" - K. S. Chithra
 "Baare Rukkamma" - S. P. Balasubrahmanyam
 "Baare Santhege" - S. P. Balasubrahmanyam, K. S. Chithra
 "Cheluve Neenu Nakkare" - S. P. Balasubrahmanyam, Manjula Gururaj
 "Nooru Hennu Kandu" - S. P. Balasubrahmanyam, K. S. Chithra
 "O Geleyane" - K. S. Chithra

References

External links 
 

1991 films
1990s Kannada-language films
Films scored by Hamsalekha
Films directed by Dorai–Bhagavan